World Trade Center Jakarta is a complex of commercial high-rise buildings at Jalan Jenderal Sudirman, Jakarta, Indonesia. The buildings of the complex are named as  WTC 1, WTC 2, WTC 3, WTC 5 and WTC 6. WTC 5 and WTC 6 of the complex was completed in 1985, which were then known as Wisma Metropolitan I and Wisma Metropolitan II.

The skyscraper topped off in April 2017.

See also
 List of tallest buildings in Indonesia
 List of tallest buildings in Jakarta

References

Buildings and structures in Jakarta
Skyscrapers in Indonesia
Skyscraper office buildings in Indonesia
Post-independence architecture of Indonesia